Ruben Darío "El Huracán" Palacio (1 December 1962 in Puerto Nare, Antioquia – 14 November 2003 in Medellín, Colombia) was a Colombian boxer.

Professional career 
Palacio fought 11 years before surprisingly winning the WBO title in England with an eighth-round technical knockout of British star Colin McMillan after McMillan dislocated his shoulder on 26 September 1992.

Before that, Palacio had tried unsuccessfully to win a world title on 3 occasions and never gave up on his dream, even when he had very low points in his career (between 1984 and 1986, for example, he lost 4 out of 5 fights).

He was very much the underdog against the flashy 23-1 McMillan but Palacio had his night of glory that day in London. Ironically, he returned to England to defend his title and then he was diagnosed with the HIV virus by the British Boxing Board of Control. Palacio had to relinquish the belt he had waited so long to win and retired with a 45-11-2 (19 KO) record.

Life after boxing
After relinquishing the belt, the former champion's life was a tragic downward spiral. He was arrested on drug trafficking charges in the US a year after and spent four years in jail.

Death
Palacio died of AIDS in a hospital in Medellín, Colombia on 14 November 2003. He was a few weeks short of his 41st birthday.

References

External links
 

1962 births
2003 deaths
World Boxing Organization champions
Colombian male boxers
Featherweight boxers
Sportspeople from Antioquia Department
20th-century Colombian people